Tlilapan is a municipality located in the central zone in the State of Veracruz, about 85 km from state capital Xalapa. It has a surface of 23.85 km2. The name comes from the language Náhuatl, that means “Black creek ". The village exists from the 16th century and the national independence constituted the consumarse a municipality that was adjacent to Orizaba, San Andrés Tenejapa, San Francisco Necoxtla and San Juan of the Rio, in 1880 the municipal cemetery is established and, in 1916 the first Municipal President is named.

Geography
The municipality of Tlilapan is bordered to the north by Rafael Delgado, to the south by Huiloapan de Cuauhtémoc and to the west by Nogales . It is watered by small rivers as the Río Blanco.

Agriculture
It produces principally maize, coffee and sugarcane.

Celebrations
In July, Tlilapan festival takes place the celebration of Santiago Apostol, Patron of the town, and in December a celebration takes place in honor of Virgen de Guadalupe.

Weather
The weather in Tlilapan is very cold and wet all year with rains in summer and autumn.

References

External links 
  Municipal Official webpage
  Municipal Official Information

Municipalities of Veracruz